Roulette is a popular game of chance in casinos.

Roulette may also refer to:

Places
Roulette, Pennsylvania
Roulette Township, Potter County, Pennsylvania, in the United States

Films
Roulette (2011 film), an American independent film
Roulette (1924 film), an American silent drama film

Music
Roulette (band), a popular Russian-International Emo / Hard Rock band
Roulette Records, a disco / French house label eventually sold to EMI
The Roulettes, English rock band
Roulette (album), a 2013 album by Blue
""Roulette" (instrumental), an instrumental that was a UK number-one hit for Russ Conway in 1959
"Roulette", a song by Bon Jovi from their 1984 debut album Bon Jovi
"Roulette", a song by Brotherhood of Man from the 1978 album B for Brotherhood
"Roulette", a song by Bruce Springsteen on the album Tracks
"Roulette", a song by Katy Perry from the 2017 album Witness
"Roulette", a song by Machine Gun Kelly from his album Hotel Diablo
"Roulette", a song by System of a Down off the album Steal This Album!

Other uses
Roulette (comics), Marvel Comics character and DC character
Roulette (curve), a kind of curve used in differential geometry
Roulette, a small cut used for paper separation, see Postage stamp separation
Roulette or Marseille Roulette, a French term for an association football trick otherwise called the Marseille turn
Roulette Intermedium, an arts organisation and performing arts venue in Brooklyn, New York
Roulettes, Royal Australian Air Force formation aerobatic display team
Russian roulette (Russkaya ruletka), an analogy for or the actual lethal game of chance in which a player places a single round in a revolver, spins the cylinder, places the muzzle against his or her head, and pulls the trigger

See also
Roulet, a surname